State Route 241 (SR 241) is a  long north-south state highway that lies mostly in northwestern Lawrence County, Tennessee, with a small portion extending into southern Lewis County.

Route description

SR 241 begins in Lawrence County as Red Hill-Center Road at an intersection with US 64/SR 15 between Lawrenceburg and Deerfield. It heads northwest through farmland and rural areas to have an intersection and short concurrency with SR 240 before passing along the eastern edge of the Laurel Hill Wildlife Management Area as Napier Road. The highway then enters more wooded areas to cross into Lewis County, where it passes by the Natchez Trace Trading Post and the Natchez Trace RV Campground before taking a turn to the west to enter the Wildlife Management Area shortly before coming to an end at an interchange with the Natchez Trace Parkway, with the road continuing on as Napier Lake Road. The entire route of SR 241 is a two-lane highway.

Major intersections

References

241
Transportation in Lawrence County, Tennessee
Transportation in Lewis County, Tennessee